Urzhum is a rural locality (a selo) in Dubrovsky Selsoviet, Aleysky District, Altai Krai, Russia. The population was 237 as of 2013. There are 5 streets.

Geography 
Urzhum is located 36 km southeast of Aleysk (the district's administrative centre) by road. Priyatelsky is the nearest rural locality.

References 

Rural localities in Aleysky District